Patrick Allotey (13 December 1978 – 27 June 2007) was a football defender from Ghana.

Career 
Born in Accra, Allotey played five official matches for Feyenoord Rotterdam. He also served Excelsior Rotterdam.

Even though Allotey only played a few matches for Feyenoord, he is part of their history in the 1990s and 2000s as he was one of the main persons in the FIOD-affaire at Feyenoord. In 1998 the Fiscal Intelligence and Investigation Service (FIOD) visited Feyenoord because of suspected fraud. Mainly based on the signings of Aurelio Vidmar, Christian Gyan and Allotey. This became an ongoing scandal in the years to come with chairman Jorien van den Herik as the main suspect. Eventually in 2006 both Feyenoord and Van den Herik were cleared of any charges.

Death 
Allotey died in Accra, Ghana on June 27, 2007. It was said he was suffering from headaches, collapsed while with friends and was taken to hospital. The player was said to be suffering from hypoglycemia, a condition caused by low blood sugar level. For this reason, he had been inactive as far as football was concerned, until his death.

International 
Feyenoord scouted Allotey at the 1995 FIFA Under-17 World Championships in Ecuador where Ghana became World Champions. He featured in a team with players like Awudu Issaka, Stephen Appiah and Emanuel Bentil. He was one of the best left-footed footballers Ghana ever produced. Although he was a defender, his surging runs on the flanks made him one of the most sought-after players subsequent to the Ecuador 1995 World under-17 championship.

References

External links

1978 births
2007 deaths
Ghanaian footballers
Feyenoord players
Excelsior Rotterdam players
Eredivisie players
Ghanaian expatriate footballers
Expatriate footballers in the Netherlands
Ghanaian expatriate sportspeople in the Netherlands
Footballers from Accra
1998 African Cup of Nations players
Association football defenders
Ghana international footballers